Angam is a documentary film made in 2010 about Sri Lankan history and the survival of its traditional martial art, angampora. It was produced and directed by Rasanga Weerasinghe. The film explores the origins of Sri Lankan civilization, and the vital role Angampora has played in its history, up to the present day. The film was released in 2011 at Goethe Institute, Colombo, as a private screening organized by the filmmakers.

Cast 
 Dr. Siran Upendra Deraniyagala
 Dr. Riyency Wickramasinghe
 G. Karunapala
 Athula Nandana Perera
 Oliver Hermann
 Piumal Edirisinghe

Plot 
Angam: The Art of War, film talks about the origin, evolution & technical details of the martial art Angampora. The film also discusses its current situation and how they managed to attract local and foreign interest to this dying art. The story is told through historical facts & folk stories along with detailed angampora demonstrations. Angam: The Art of War, features veteran Angampora masters such as Dr. Wikramasinghe, G. Karunapala and Athula Nandasena along with the world-renowned archaeologist Dr. Siran Upendra Deraniyagala.

Screenings & Distribution 
The film was premiered at Goethe-Institut Film Forum in 2011 followed by couple of other very successful screenings in Sri Lanka & Germany. In 2012 the film got acquired by Grindout Pictures to be distributed worldwide.

References 

 Dailymirror article on Angam the movie

External links 
 
 
 Goethe Institute article
 Angampora in Sri Lanka
 Dailymirror article on Angam the movie
 Sinhalaya.com article on Angam the movie

2011 films
2010s Sinhala-language films
2011 documentary films